BEI-Teesside is a planned biomass power station, expected to be built on the River Tees at Port Clarence.

Development
The scheme was first announced in late 2009. It was developed by Bio Energy Investments (BEI), and the plant designed by Heatherwick Studio. The plant was granted planning permission on 17 March 2010, with construction expected to start later that year. The plant was expected to be completed in 2012, at a cost of £150 million, while creating 200 construction jobs and 40 full-time jobs when the plant is complete.

The land earmarked for the construction of the plant is a  6 hectare brownfield site alongside the Middlesbrough Transporter Bridge, which hasn't been used in 50 years since the Clarence Iron Works were demolished. The plant would occupy 2 hectares of the site, with the rest being landscaped.

However the prospect of the plant being built at all was put into doubt in June 2011 when BEI announced that without financial support from the Government, they would cancel the scheme, with the company being wound up. Construction began in January 2016.

Specification
The plant is expected to be fueled by reprocessed pine kernel shells, to generate 49 megawatts of electricity, enough to power 50,000 homes.

References

Power stations in North East England
Buildings and structures in County Durham
Proposed biofuel power stations
Proposed renewable energy power stations in England